The 1975 Paris Open, also known as the Jean Becker Open,  was a Grand Prix men's tennis tournament played onindoor carpet courts. It was the 6th edition of the Paris Open (later known as the Paris Masters). It took place at the Palais omnisports de Paris-Bercy in Paris, France from 27 October through 2 November 1975. Tom Okker won the singles title.

Finals

Singles

 Tom Okker defeated  Arthur Ashe 6–3, 2–6, 6–3, 3–6, 6–4
 It was Okker's 6th title of the year and the 61st of his career.

Doubles

 Wojciech Fibak /  Karl Meiler defeated  Ilie Năstase /  Tom Okker 6–4, 7–6
 It was Fibak's 4th title of the year and the 4th of his career. It was Meiler's 2nd title of the year and the 11th of his career.

References

External links 
 ATP tournament profile
 ITF tournament edition details